Rhysia is a genus of cnidarians belonging to the monotypic family Rhysiidae.

The species of this genus are found in Western North America.

Species:

Rhysia autumnalis 
Rhysia fletcheri 
Rhysia halecii

References

Filifera
Hydrozoan genera